= World Family Organization =

Non-governmental organization

The World Family Organization (WFO) is a non-governmental organization that works to "represent families of the world at all levels, to defend their interests and to act with them and for them through government and multilateral advocacy."

Originally founded in 1946 in Brussels, Belgium as the "International Congress for Families and Population," the organization held the first World Family Congress in Paris in 1947. The organization worked to reunify families in the aftermath of World War II and was formally named the "International Union of Family Organization" from 1947 to 1998. The organization obtained consultative status with the United Nations Economic and Social Council in 1948. The organization was renamed as the "World Family Organization" in 1998 and currently has members from 180 countries.

The mission of the WFO is "To promote means, opportunity, equal rights and chances for women and men to assume their role and functions within the Family and Society, in conditions of freedom, equity, security and human dignity, and promote policies and actions to bring about better life condition to all Families, respecting their diversity and cultures."
